Clear Island or Cape Clear Island (officially known by its Irish name: Cléire, and sometimes also called Oileán Chléire) is an island off the south-west coast of County Cork in Ireland. It is the southernmost inhabited part of Ireland and has a population of 147 people. It is an official Gaeltacht area (Irish-speaking area), and most inhabitants speak Irish and English. The island is divided into east and west halves by an isthmus called the Waist, with the North Harbour to the landward side and the South Harbour on the seaward side. Ferries sail regularly from the North Harbour to Schull and Baltimore on the mainland. The South Harbour is a popular berth for yachts and pleasure boats.

History
Archaeological sites on the island include a prehistoric cup-marked stone (currently in the island's museum), a fulacht fiadh at Gort na Lobhar, a neolithic passage tomb at Cill Leire Forabhain, several standing stones around the island, a promontory fort at Dún an Óir, and a signal tower dating from the Napoleonic Wars. The island also has a number of early Christian sites, and is reputed to be the birthplace of Saint Ciarán of Saigir. The ruin of a 12th-century church, which has protected national monument status, is close to the main pier in the North Harbour.

The island had a population of over 1,052 before the 19th century famine, but the current population of Cape Clear is less than one-eighth of that figure. The island's primary school was built in 1897, and was visited by President of Ireland Mary McAleese in 1998.

Cape Clear was originally supplied with electricity produced by diesel generators on the island, but around 1995 these were replaced with a submarine power cable from the mainland.

Culture and language
The island is officially identified as a Gaeltacht (Irish-speaking) area. According to the 2016 census there were 145 people over the age of 3 living on the island, with 62% claiming to be able to speak Irish and 27% saying they spoke Irish daily outside the education system.

The population of the island increases in the summer months as students visit the local Irish Colleges, Coláiste Phobal Chléire and Coláiste Chiaráin. Students stay in local houses or dorms and improve their spoken Irish as part of the immersion courses within the Gaeltacht.

Every first weekend of September, the island hosts the Cape Clear Island International Storytelling Festival. The festival has been running annually since 1994.

Wildlife
Seals, basking sharks and dolphins are often found in the surrounding waters, while sea pinks and honeysuckle are common plants on the land. Cape Clear is home to a lighthouse and a bird observatory. Cape Clear is popular with bird watchers and at certain times of the year is home to many species of migratory birds as its climate is milder than the mainland and thus more attractive. Bird life includes black and common guillemots, cormorants and storm petrels.

References

Further reading
 Cape Clear Island, Éamon Lankford, 1999
 Ghostwritten, David Mitchell, 1999
 Staideár Cuimsitheach Teangeolaíoch ar Úsáid na Gaeilge sa Ghaeltacht, Committee of Community, Rural and Gaeltacht Affairs, 2007
 The Night Swimmer, Matt Bondurant, 2012

External links

Cape Clear Ferries website

Islands of County Cork
Gaeltacht places in County Cork
Tourist attractions in County Cork
Gaeltacht towns and villages
Bird observatories
Marilyns of Ireland